Con Hogan (4 October 1903 – 3 March 1987) was an  Australian rules footballer who played with Fitzroy in the Victorian Football League (VFL).

Notes

External links 

1903 births
1987 deaths
Australian rules footballers from Victoria (Australia)
Fitzroy Football Club players